John Hession (September 8, 1877 – February 1, 1962) was an American sports shooter. He competed in two events at the 1908 Summer Olympics. He was described by some as the greatest shooter of all time, according to the Tampa Bay Times.

References

1877 births
1962 deaths
American male sport shooters
Olympic shooters of the United States
Shooters at the 1908 Summer Olympics
People from Huron County, Ontario
Sportspeople from Ontario
Canadian emigrants to the United States